The 86th running of the Milan–San Remo cycling classic was held on 18 March 1995 and won by French rider Laurent Jalabert in a two-man sprint with Maurizio Fondriest. It was the first leg of the 1995 UCI Road World Cup.  162 of 193 riders finished.

Race summary
First-year professional Cristian Salvato was in a solo breakaway for 220 km. Russian favourite Evgueni Berzin punctured on the descent of Cipressa, but returned after a furious pursuit. On the Poggio, Italian classics specialist Maurizio Fondriest broke clear, followed by Laurent Jalabert. On the descent, a chase group of five, with Dimitri Konyshev, Stefano Zanini, Davide Rebellin and Michele Bartoli, was slowed down by a mechanical problem of Konyshev who piloted the group. Jalabert and Fondriest headed off in a two-man sprint on San Remo's Via Roma, with Jalabert easily taking the honours.

The 26-year old Jalabert became the fourth rider to win the classicissima after winning Paris–Nice one week prior – joining Fred De Bruyne, Eddy Merckx and Sean Kelly. The day after the race, French sports daily l'Équipe titled: "un champion nous est donné" (a champion was given to us).

Results

References

1995
March 1994 sports events in Europe
1995 in road cycling
1995 in Italian sport
Milan-San Remo